Bascha Mika (born 17 January 1954) is a German journalist and publicist. From 1998 to July 2009, she was editor-in-chief of Die Tageszeitung and has held the same post at Frankfurt Rundschau since April 2014. At Die Tageszeitung, Mika was the only female editor-in-chief of a national newspaper in Germany.

Biography
Born Barbara Mika in Komprachcice, near Opole in Upper Silesia in 1954, her family moved to Aachen in West Germany in 1959. Mika completed a bank apprenticeship after graduating from school. She spent three years working in Deutsche Bank in Aachen. Mike then went to University in Bonn and Marburg, where she studied Africa, philosophy, German and ethnology. During college Mika worked in radio and various newspapers. In her thirties, she changed her career to journalism. In 1988, Mika began working for Die Tageszeitung. Ten years later, she became one of the editors-in-chief in 1998 and the following year Mika became the sole editor-in-chief. She left the paper in mid-July 2009. Mika has worked as a professor at the Berlin University of the Arts since 2007 and was joint head of the cultural journalism course until March 2014. Since leaving that position Mika has been editor-in-chief of the Frankfurter Rundschau. Initially she was working with Arnd Festerling but since March 2019 it has been with Thomas Kaspar.

Mika wrote a biography of Alice Schwarzer which was published in 1998. The work created some controversy due to her ambivalent analysis of Schwarzer. Despite her services to the women's movement Mika claimed Schwarzer also showed contempt for women and was somewhat hostile. Mika was a member of the Media Council of the Berlin-Brandenburg Media Institute from 2003 to 2009. She is also on the board of trustees of Journalists Network and from 2018 she's been on the Board of Trustees for the Peace prize, Friedenspreis des Deutschen Buchhandels.

Awards
1994 Emma Journalist Award
2012 Luise Büchner Prize for Journalism
2017 Hedwig Dohm certificate

Bibliography

References and sources

External links

1954 births
Living people
German journalists
German women journalists
German newspaper journalists
People from Opole County
Die Tageszeitung people
German newspaper editors
Silesian-German people